John Henry Loes (18 June 1910 – 28 July 1982) was an Australian rules footballer who played with St Kilda in the Victorian Football League (VFL).

Notes

External links 

1910 births
1982 deaths
Australian rules footballers from New South Wales
St Kilda Football Club players